I disingannati (The Undeceived) is a comic opera in three acts composed by Antonio Caldara to an Italian libretto by Giovanni Claudio Pasquini based on Molière's play Le Misanthrope. It premiered on  8 February 1729 at the court theater in Vienna.

Amongst its revivals in modern times was the 1993 production at the Innsbruck Festival of Early Music conducted by Sigiswald Kuijken.

References

Operas
1729 operas
Italian-language operas
Operas by Antonio Caldara